Loukas is a Greek (male) first name. It is the Greek form of the Latin name Lucas. This name is often given to honor Luke the Evangelist.

People with the given name Loukas 
Loukas Apostolidis, a Greek footballer
Loukas Barlos, a Greek businessman
Loukas Daralas, a Greek musician
Loukas Yorkas, a Greek-Cypriot singer
Loukas Hadjiloukas, a Cypriot football manager
Loukas Kanakaris-Roufos, a Greek politician
Loukas Karadimos, a Greek footballer
Loukas Karakatsanis, a Greek footballer
 Loukas Louka (footballer) (born 1978), Cypriot football defender
 Loukas Louka (athlete) (born 1945), retired Greek Cypriot shot putter
Loukas Mavrokefalidis, a Greek basketball player
Loukas Notaras, the last Megas Doux of the Byzantine Empire
Loukas Panourgias, a Greek footballer
Loukas Papadimos, Greek economist and prime minister
Loukas Stylianou, a Cypriot football defender
Loukas Vyntra, a Czech-Greek footballer

People with the surname Loukas 
Christina Loukas, an American diver
 Loukas Louka (footballer) (born 1978), Cypriot football defender
 Loukas Louka (athlete) (born 1945), retired Greek Cypriot shot putter
Marios Louka, a Cypriot footballer

See also 
Hosios Loukas, a Greek monastery 
Lucas (disambiguation)
 Loukas, a village in the former municipality of Mantineia, 10 km south of the village of Nestani, on the eastern edge of Arcadia, in the east of the Peloponnese peninsular.

Greek masculine given names